The 2012–13 Austrian Hockey League was a season of the Austrian Hockey League (known as Erste Bank Eishockey Liga - or EBEL league - for sponsorship reasons). The Klagenfurter AC won the Austrian championship by defeating the Vienna Capitals in the Playoff Final.

First round

Second round

Final round

Qualification round

Playoffs

External links

References

Austrian Hockey League seasons
Aus
1
Aus
Aus
Aus
2012–13 in Hungarian ice hockey